Hungary has ten national parks which cover approximately 10 percent of the country's territory. The parks are managed by the National Parks of Hungary government agency (Hungarian: Nemzeti park igazgatóság).

See also
 Protected areas of Hungary

External links 
National Parks in Hungary

National parks
Hungary
National parks